Machan or Machanus was a twelfth-century Scottish saint. He was educated in Ireland and was ordained as a bishop in Rome.  He is known for his missionary work around Clachan of Campsie (or Campsie Glen), near Glasgow.  Machan built a small chapel at the bottom of the glen.  After his death, in 1175 a church was built over his grave.

In 1859 there was a St. Machan's Well at Campsie, but no trace now remains.

Most information about St Machan is lost. However, his name remains in the name of the village of Ecclesmachan in West Lothian.

References

Medieval Scottish saints
1170s deaths
12th-century Scottish Roman Catholic bishops
12th-century Christian saints